Huffs Church is a village in western Hereford Township, Berks County, Pennsylvania, United States. The West Branch Perkiomen Creek flows southeastward through the village to join the Perkiomen Creek in the Green Lane Reservoir. It is split between the Alburtis zip code of 18011 and that of the Barto zip code of 19504. Landhaven Bed & Breakfast is in the center of the village and includes five rooms, an antique general store, and occasional live music.

Unincorporated communities in Berks County, Pennsylvania
Unincorporated communities in Pennsylvania